Hymenocallis caribaea  is a plant in the Amaryllidaceae with the common names "Caribbean spider-lily" or "variegated spider-lily." It is native to the islands of the Caribbean and to northern South America. It is regarded as native to Puerto Rico, Jamaica, Hispaniola, Cuba, the Virgin Islands, and the Windward and Leeward Islands, and the Venezuelan Antilles. It is also commonly cultivated as an ornamental in many other tropical and subtropical regions and reportedly naturalized in Sri Lanka, New South Wales, Bermuda, French Guinea, Suriname, and Guyana.

Description 
Hymenocallis caribaea is a bulb-forming perennial. Leaves are up to 80 cm long. Umbel contains as many as 12 white flowers. Tepals are narrowly linear, up to 10 cm long, usually drooping at flowering time.

References

External links 

caribaea
Flora of the Caribbean
Plants described in 1753
Taxa named by Carl Linnaeus
Flora without expected TNC conservation status